"Rhythm Is Gonna Get You" is a song written by Enrique "Kiki" Garcia and Gloria Estefan, and released by Gloria Estefan and Miami Sound Machine in 1987 as the lead single from their tenth studio album, Let It Loose (1987), (and the European version of the album Anything for You). The song was their fourth top 10 (and second top five) single on the US Billboard Hot 100, peaking at number five. In the UK, it took a year and a half for the single to become a chart hit.

First released in May 1987 as the first single from Let It Loose, the song failed to chart; a reissue came in February 1988 after the song featured in Stakeout, once again the song failed to chart. However, after the success of the follow-up singles "Anything for You" and "1-2-3", the song was re-released in December 1988 just before Christmas and became a UK top 20 hit, peaking at number 16 in January 1989. The song was also featured in promos for Wheel of Fortune, with lyrics changed to "Wheel's Gonna Get You".

An extended remix was released on a 12" single in the US.

It was sampled in a 1989 Bollywood film, Tridev, in the song "Oye Oye-Tirchi Topiwale" and "Gajar ne Kiya Ishara". It was later sampled by Estefan's own 1998 single "Oye".

In 2018, it was selected for preservation in the National Recording Registry by the Library of Congress as being "culturally, historically, or artistically significant."

Critical reception
Tim Simenon for Number One wrote, "This sounds a lot like 'Just Be Good to Me' by the SOS Band. The rhythm doesn't get me at all on here I'm afraid. It sounds like very dated 70's disco."

Charts

Weekly charts

Year-end charts

Official versions and remixes
Original versions
 Album Version (aka 7" Version / Radio Version / Single Version)  — (3:54)

Pablo Flores remixes
 12" Version (aka Extended Version / O-eh O-eh Edit)  — (7:09)
 Dub Mix  — (5:58)

2006 remixes
 Radio Mix  — (3:34)
 Extended Mix  — (6:16)
 Instrumental Dub  — (3:34)

2020 version
 Album Version (available on Brazil305)  — (3:45)

Release dates

References

Gloria Estefan songs
1987 singles
Songs written by Gloria Estefan
1987 songs
Epic Records singles
Songs written by Enrique Garcia (songwriter)
United States National Recording Registry recordings